Arylakh (Arıılaax) is a rural locality (a selo) in Luchcheginsky 1-y Rural Okrug of Kobyaysky District in the Sakha Republic, Russia, located  from Sangar, the administrative center of the district and  from Bagadya, the administrative center of the rural okrug. Its population as of the 2002 Census was 91.

References

Notes

Sources
Official website of the Sakha Republic. Registry of the Administrative-Territorial Divisions of the Sakha Republic. Kobyaysky District. 

Rural localities in Kobyaysky District